The Batchelor–Chandrasekhar equation is the evolution equation for the scalar functions, defining the two-point velocity correlation tensor of a homogeneous axisymmetric turbulence, named after George Batchelor and Subrahmanyan Chandrasekhar. They developed the theory of homogeneous axisymmetric turbulence based on Howard P. Robertson's work on isotropic turbulence using an invariant principle. This equation is an extension of Kármán–Howarth equation from isotropic to axisymmetric turbulence.

Mathematical description

Let the two-point correlation for homogeneous turbulence be 

A single scalar describes this correlation tensor in isotropic turbulence, whereas, it turns out for axisymmetric turbulence, two scalar functions are enough to uniquely specify the correlation tensor. In fact, Batchelor was unable to express the correlation tensor in terms of two scalar functions, but ended up with four scalar functions, nevertheless, Chandrasekhar showed that it could be expressed with only two scalar functions by expressing the solenoidal axisymmetric tensor as the curl of a general axisymmetric skew tensor (reflectionally non-invariant tensor).

Let  and  be the two scalar functions that describes the correlation function, then the most general axisymmetric tensor which is solenoidal (incompressible) is given by,

where

 

The differential operators appearing in the above expressions are defined as

Then the evolution equations (equivalent form of Kármán–Howarth equation) for the two scalar functions are given by

where  is the kinematic viscosity and 

The triply correlated tensor is

 

Here  is the density of the fluid.

Properties

 The trace of the correlation tensor reduces to 

Decay of the turbulence
During decay, if we neglect the triple correlation scalars, then the equations reduce to axially symmetric five-dimensional heat equations,

Solutions to these five-dimensional heat equation was solved by Chandrasekhar. The initial conditions can be expressed in terms of Gegenbauer polynomials (without loss of generality),

where  are Gegenbauer polynomials. The required solutions are

where  is the Bessel function of the first kind. 

As  the solutions become independent of 

where

See also
 Kármán–Howarth equation 
 Kármán–Howarth–Monin equation

References

Equations of fluid dynamics
Fluid dynamics
Turbulence